Donnie Ray Moore (February 13, 1954 – July 18, 1989) was an American relief pitcher in Major League Baseball (MLB) who played for the Chicago Cubs (1975, 1977–79), St. Louis Cardinals (1980), Milwaukee Brewers (1981), Atlanta Braves (1982–84) and California Angels (1985–88). Moore is best remembered for the home run he gave up to Dave Henderson while pitching for the California Angels in Game 5 of the 1986 American League Championship Series. With only one more strike needed to clinch the team's first-ever pennant, he allowed the Boston Red Sox to come back and eventually win the game. Boston then won Games 6 and 7 to take the series. Shortly after his professional career ended, he shot his wife three times in a dispute and then committed suicide.

Early life
Moore was born on February 13, 1954, in Lubbock, Texas, and was the cousin of MLB player Hubie Brooks. Moore attended Paris Junior College and Ranger College before he was selected by the Chicago Cubs in the first round of the January secondary phase of the 1973 Major League Baseball draft.

Playing career 
In a 13-season career, Moore posted a 43–40 record with 89 saves, 416 strikeouts, and a 3.67 earned run average in 655 innings. Moore also compiled a .281 batting average with 11 runs batted in. He was selected as an All-Star in 1985 after developing a splitter with a slider and a breaking ball.

Game 5 of the 1986 American League Championship Series 
The game took place on October 12, 1986 in Anaheim. The Angels held a 3–1 series lead against the Boston Red Sox. In the game, the Angels held a 5–2 lead going into the ninth inning. A home run by Boston's Don Baylor made it a 5–4 game.

When Moore came in to pitch, there were two outs and Rich Gedman, who had been hit by a pitch, was on first base. The Angels were one strike away from advancing to the World Series for the first time in franchise history. Dave Henderson hit a 2–2 pitch off Moore for a home run to give the Red Sox a 6–5 lead. The Angels were able to score a run in the bottom of the ninth, pushing the game into extra innings.

Moore remained in the game for the Angels; he was able to stifle a tenth inning Red Sox rally by getting Jim Rice to ground into a double play. Nonetheless, the Red Sox were able to score off Moore in the 11th inning via a sacrifice fly by Henderson. The Angels did not score in the bottom of the 11th, and lost the game 7–6. The defeat left the Angels with a 3–2 series advantage with two more games to play at Fenway Park. However, the Angels lost both games, by scores of 10–4 and 8–1.

After Game 5, Moore admitted that he made a bad pitch to Henderson.  "I was throwing fastballs and Henderson was fouling them off, so I went with the split-finger, thought maybe I'd catch him off guard, but it was right in his swing."

Later career 
Moore was battling injury at the time of the 1986 American League Championship Series and was never able to remain injury-free afterward. After saving nine more games in 41 appearances over the next two seasons, Moore was released by the Angels. He signed with the Kansas City Royals for the 1989 season, but played only in the minor leagues before being released in June of that year, ending his 14-year career in baseball.

Suicide 
On July 18, 1989, Moore had an argument with his wife Tonya and shot her three times with a .45 pistol. The incident occurred at their Anaheim Hills home, with their three children in the house at the time. Tonya Moore and daughter Demetria, then 17 years of age, fled from the house and Demetria drove her mother to the hospital. Tonya survived the shooting. Back inside the house, still in the presence of at least one of his sons, Moore then put the gun to his head and committed suicide. He was 35.

References

Further reading
 The Atlantic: The Myth of the Home Run That Drove an Angels Pitcher to Suicide
 Bell, Christopher: Scapegoats: Baseballers whose Careers Are Marked by One Fateful Play (c) 2002 McFarland and Company 
 ESPN: The Donnie Moore Story (video)

External links 

 Retrosheet Boxscore: 1986 American League Championship Series Game Five
 Baseball's 25 Greatest Moments (#24)
 

1954 births
1989 deaths
African-American baseball players
American expatriate baseball players in Venezuela
American League All-Stars
Atlanta Braves players
Baseball players from Texas
California Angels players
Chicago Cubs players
Gulf Coast Cubs players
Key West Conchs players
Major League Baseball pitchers
Midland Cubs players
Milwaukee Brewers players
Omaha Royals players
Palm Springs Angels players
Paris Dragons baseball players
People from Anaheim Hills, California
Ranger Rangers baseball players
Richmond Braves players
Sportspeople from Lubbock, Texas
Springfield Redbirds players
St. Louis Cardinals players
Suicides by firearm in California
Tiburones de La Guaira players
Wichita Aeros players
1989 suicides
20th-century African-American sportspeople